The 2011 World Shotgun Championships were held in September 2011 in Belgrade, Serbia. 

As in all odd-numbered years, separate ISSF World Shooting Championships were carried out in the trap, double trap, and skeet events.

Competition schedule

Men

Women

Medal summary

Seniors

Juniors

References
Official schedule
Results

2011
2011 in shooting sports
2011 in Serbian sport
2011 World Shotgun Championships
International sports competitions in Belgrade
Shooting competitions in Serbia
September 2011 sports events in Europe